The Women's 4 × 200 metre freestyle relay competition of the swimming events at the 2015 World Aquatics Championships in Kazan, Russia, was held on 6 August with the heats and the final.

Records
Prior to the competition, the existing world and championship records were as follows.

Results

Heats
The heats were held at 10:57.

Final
The final was held at 19:16.

References

Women's 4 x 200 metre freestyle relay
2015 in women's swimming